Rozpor is a Slovakian punk band from Bratislava, Slovakia, performing Oi! and hardcore punk. They are known for their strict anti-fascist stance.

History 
The band began performing in May 1999. Members put down its formation to a dislike of the numerous sophists and pseudo-intellectuals flooding the Bratislava anarcho-punk and crustcore scenes of the time, and as a response to the absence of bands of a similar nature in the region. Rejecting lyrics about transnational corporations and the third world as issues distant from their lives, they planned songs on topics they knew and which impacted them directly. They also wanted to avoid tormented clichés about police, neo-Nazis, and "the system".

In 2000, Rozpor self-published their debut album/demo, Nezabudneme! (We Will Not Forget!). Their 2002 album, Ilegálna spravodlivosť (Illegal Justice), brought the band not only participation in punk compilations and intensive touring in Slovakia, the Czech Republic, and nearby, but also a creative decade of additional releases under "Žiadna značka – No label", by which the band highlights the DIY (Do It Yourself) ethic.

Rozpor has gained notoriety for its passionate and original stage show, the frequent brawls accompanying its performances, many of its fans' rowdy nature, for playing shows in poverty-stricken Roma regions, and for their opposition to Slovak far right politician Marian Kotleba. The band drew minor controversy in 2008 following an appearance on Česká televize, when the Czech Republic's Council for Radio and Television Broadcasting investigated a complaint about the display of an Antifa flag and the lead singer's "Good Night White Pride" T-shirt during the broadcast.

Personnel

Current members 
 Fabko – lead vocals (2015 – present), drums (2011)
 Zorro – drums (2013 – present)
 Datra – lead guitar, vocals (1999 – present)
 Bedla – bass, vocals (2015 – present)

Past members 
 Filip – drums, vocals (1999 – 2013)
 Walter – lead vocals (1999 – 2001)
 Lupes – bass, vocals (1999 – 2011)
 Jazzy – bass, vocals (2011 – 2015)
 Rumun – lead vocals (2001 – 2015, additional appearances in later videos and recordings)
 Žlna – drums (2011, 2018)
 Harley – drums (2011, 2016)

Discography 
 2000 - Nezabudneme! MC+CD (Žiadna značka – No label)
 2002 - Ilegálna spravodlivosť CD (Žiadna značka – No label)
 2004 - Organizovaný punk CD (Žiadna značka – No label)
 2009 - RozpoR...su uchilny zido bolsevycky fetaci!!! CD (Žiadna značka – No label)
 2011 - V lete oi, v zime crust... LP (Žiadna značka – No label)
 2014 - Soundtrack out of the Box LP split (Žiadna značka – No label)
 2016 - Radikálna ľudskosť 10" LP picture disc (Žiadna značka – No label)

Collaborations 
 2001 - Czech and slovak streetkids vol. 1 CD (Rabiát Records)
 2003 - Czech and slovak streetkids vol. 2 CD (Rabiát Records)
 2005 - Drivin' 2 Hell CD (Kids and Heroes Records)
 2006 - Punkrock made in Slovakia vol. 5 CD (Musica, s.r.o.)
 2008 - Garaż nr. 26 Promo CD (Jimmy Jazz Records)
 2010 - A tribute to The Oppressed CD (SHR Records)
 2011 - Critical Mass riddim

Videos 
 2006 - "Fanatik"
 2008 - "Môj pohreb (Parte)"
 2011 - "Nestala sa z nás už pi*ovina?"
 2012 - "Zostarnúť mladý"
 2013 - "Potrebujeme makať na sebe"
 2015 - "Vlk"

References

External links 

 Official website
 Official Facebook page

Oi! groups
Slovak punk rock groups